Haighton is a civil parish in the City of Preston, Lancashire, England. It is a rural area north east of the urban city of Preston, beyond Fulwood and Brookfield.

Geography
Haighton also contains the hamlets of Haighton Green and Haighton Top. It is separated from the city by the M6 motorway, with junction 31A on the boundary with Brookfield.

Community
The area was intended to become a residential suburb as part of the Central Lancashire New Town, with population increasing to 29,100 by 2001 however it never occurred and the area has remained rural.  It has a population of 197, increasing to 202 at the 2011 Census.

Economy
The listed building of Haighton Manor has operated as a country pub and restaurant since the early 1970s, undergoing substantial renovation in the mid 2010s and now operated by Brunning and Price.

History
The parish was part of Preston Rural District throughout its existence from 1894 to 1974. In 1974 the parish became part of the Borough of Preston, which became a city in 2002.

See also

Listed buildings in Haighton

References

External links

Haighton page on British History Online
Haighton Manor Country Hotel

Geography of the City of Preston
Civil parishes in Lancashire